On My Walk is a young children's book (recommended for ages 2–5) by Kari-Lynn Winters and Christina Leist. It was published in 2009 by Tradewind Books.

Awards
 Finalist: 2010 BC Book Prize  ("Christie Harris Illustrated Children's Literature Prize") and sponsored tour
 Nominated: 2010-2011 Chocolate Lilly British Columbia Reader's Choice Award
 Selected: Toronto Public Library First and Best of 2010
 Selected: Resource Links Year's Best 2010
 Selected: Edmonton Public Library's 100 Great Books to Read Together, 2012
 Selected: TVOParents Book Club Best Books for your 6-8 Year Old (2013) and Books for the Budding Activist (2011)

Plot
Mothers and toddlers take a stroll through Vancouver streets and parks, hearing the sounds of animals around them, and find themselves caught in a summer rainstorm on a Kitsilano beach. The writing style is a unique sing-song rhythm employing children's onomatopoeia.

Stage adaptation
In 2016, the book was adapted for stage, with an original screenplay by Winters and Marcie Nestman. Commissioned by Carousal Theatre for Young People in Vancouver BC, the play opens in June 2016.

External links
Published reviews of On My Walk
Tradewind Books page on On My Walk
Kari-Lynn Winters personal page
Christina Leist personal page

References

Canadian children's books
Children's fiction books
2009 children's books
 American picture books
Vancouver in fiction